Milwaukie  is a city mostly in Clackamas County, Oregon, United States; a very small portion of the city extends into Multnomah County. The population was 21,119 at the 2020 census. Founded in 1847 on the banks of the Willamette River, the city, known as the Dogwood City of the West, was incorporated in 1903 and is the birthplace of the Bing cherry. The city is now a suburb of Portland and also adjoins the unincorporated areas of Clackamas and Oak Grove.

History
Milwaukie was settled in 1847 and formally platted in 1849 as a rival to the upriver Oregon City by Lot Whitcomb, who named it for Milwaukee, Wisconsin. At the time, the Wisconsin city was also frequently spelled "Milwaukie" before the current spelling was adopted. Some accounts also state that the Oregon city used an alternate spelling to prevent confusion at the post office.

Whitcomb arrived in Oregon in 1848 and settled on a donation land claim, where he built a sawmill and a gristmill. Milwaukie rivaled Portland and Oregon City for a time, but Portland eventually became the bigger city because it had a deeper port. The first post office at Milwaukie was established in 1850, with Whitcomb as the first postmaster. The community was incorporated by the Oregon Legislative Assembly on February 4, 1903, originally as the Town of Milwaukie.

The Oregon and California Railroad named their station there Milwaukee in 1870 and corrected it to Milwaukie in 1892. As the city center grew further from the railroad and a branch line was built across the Willamette to Oswego, Milwaukie station was replaced and renamed Lambert for Joseph H. Lambert, a pioneer orchardist who developed the Lambert cherry. The name of the station was changed to East Milwaukee in 1913 and corrected to East Milwaukie in 1916.

The Bing cherry, among other varieties, was developed in Milwaukie by Ah Bing, an orchard foreman employed by Seth Lewelling. A mural in the city commemorates Mr. Bing's accomplishment.

Geography
Parks include Dogwood Park, Elk Rock Island, Kronberg Park, Milwaukie Riverfront Park, and Spring Park.

Demographics

2010 census

As of the census of 2010, there were 20,291 people, 8,667 households, and 5,075 families residing in the city. The racial makeup of the city was 88.5% White, 1.3% African American, 1.3% Native American, 2.5% Asian, 0.3% Pacific Islander, 2.5% from other races, and 3.6% from two or more races. Hispanic or Latino of any race were 7.0% of the population.

There were 8,667 households, of which 27.9% had children under the age of 18 living with them, 41.5% were married couples living together, 11.9% had a female householder with no spouse present, 5.2% had a male householder with no spouse present, and 41.4% were non-families. 31.8% of all households were made up of individuals, and 10.4% had someone living alone who was 65 years of age or older. The average household size was 2.32 and the average family size was 2.91.

The median age in the city was 39.9 years. 20.7% of residents were under the age of 18; 7.7% were between the ages of 18 and 24; 28.8% were from 25 to 44; 29.2% were from 45 to 64; and 13.6% were 65 years of age or older. The gender makeup of the city was 48.6% male and 51.4% female.

Economy

In 2009 new apartments and retail space were under construction in the downtown area of Milwaukie, and a riverfront park was being developed.

Milwaukie is the home of Dark Horse Comics. Dark Horse is known for publishing works including Sin City, the character Hellboy, and the original graphic novel series 300, as well for producing dozens of films and television series, including The Mask and Timecop, based on characters created by Dark Horse founder Mike Richardson. The total office space of Dark Horse Comics occupies three city blocks in downtown Milwaukie, sporting numerous display windows visible to transit riders.

Bob's Red Mill is located here and employs a few hundred people.

Housing 
In 2015–2016, Milwaukie saw a boom in real estate. It was named the ninth hottest real estate market in 2016 by realtor.com. A big draw to the city was noticed right after the Orange Line from TriMet finished in 2015. A $1.4 billion project connecting the close-in suburb right to the heart of downtown Portland. A year into the new Orange Line, pricing for homes raised up 12.2% and city officials said there are zero vacancies for retail storefronts in Milwaukie's downtown area. In addition to the new Orange Line, Milwaukie finished a $2.2 million project to the city's waterfront park. The city had a grand opening on May 1, 2015.

Top employers
According to Milwaukie's 2012 Comprehensive Annual Financial Report, the top employers in the city are:

Education

Milwaukie is served by the North Clackamas School District and most children attend one of ten public elementary schools, Alder Creek Middle School or Wilbur Rowe Middle School, depending on area of residence, Rex Putnam High School, Milwaukie High School for regular high school education, and New Urban High School for alternative education. Since 1996, Milwaukie High School has annually hosted the nationally recognized Living History Day. On this day thousands of veterans are welcomed into the school to help educate students about the past.

There is also a private Catholic high school, La Salle High School, named after St. Jean-Baptiste de la Salle, and the Portland Waldorf School, a private Waldorf school, which serves grades K–12.

The city is home to the Ledding Library, a public library that is part of the Library Information Network of Clackamas County.

The city has one college campus, Clackamas Community College Harmony.

Transportation

Public transit

Current

Milwaukie is within the TriMet transit district and is served by several TriMet bus lines.  TriMet established a transit center in downtown Milwaukie in 1981, served by as many as 12 routes (as of 2000), using on-street stops around the intersection of Jackson Street and 21st Avenue, next to Milwaukie City Hall. Since 2010, the bus stops that previously comprised Milwaukie TC are no longer designated as a "transit center" by TriMet. In fall 2015, the focal point for rider transfers between routes shifted southward from the former transit-center location, with the opening of a new light rail station at the south end of downtown.

TriMet's MAX Light Rail service was extended to Milwaukie on September 12, 2015. Construction of the MAX Orange Line, a light-rail connection between Portland and Milwaukie, began in 2011. Although this project had been planned for many years, it faced strong opposition by opponents of "Portland Creep"; in September 2012, opponents succeeded in passing a ballot initiative requiring that all Clackamas County spending on light rail be directly approved by the voters. The  line was sufficiently complete by May 15, 2015, for 500 passengers to make an initial special run along its whole length. Regular passenger service began four months later.

Past
Streetcars began serving Milwaukie in August 1892, when the East Side Railway Company extended its service beyond the then-town of Sellwood.  The company built a carbarn and workshop in downtown Milwaukie, on Jackson Street at River Road (now McLoughlin Blvd. at that location), which opened in December 1892.  The following year, the company extended its line to Oregon City, and interurban service between Portland and Oregon City via Milwaukie began operating.  During the several decades after 1900, a succession of other private companies, including the Portland Railway, Light and Power Company, operated the streetcar and interurban service to and through the town.  All interurban service was discontinued in January 1958. At the time, the Portland–Milwaukie–Oregon City and Portland–Sellwood–Bellrose lines had been the last streetcar or interurban service operating in the Portland metropolitan area, and not until 1986 did interurban service return—in the form of MAX (light rail) between Portland and Gresham.  Oregon Motor Stages, Inc., had provided some bus service through Milwaukie until 1954, when it abruptly ceased all operation. Replacement transit-bus service was introduced in 1955 by Intercity Buses, Inc., a member of a consortium of four bus companies collectively known as the "Blue Bus" lines, and Intercity expanded its service after the 1958 abandonment of the rail service.  TriMet, a new government-owned public transit authority, was established in 1969, and in September 1970 it took over all of the "Blue Bus" companies.  TriMet has been the primary provider of transit service in Milwaukie since that time.

Former Amtrak service

Amtrak passenger trains pass through Milwaukie without stopping. However, for a brief period in the early 1980s an experimental Amtrak service named the Willamette Valley Express made a regular stop in Milwaukie, just east of the intersection of Harrison Street and Highway 224 (a location Amtrak referred to as East Milwaukie).  The service, which ran twice a day in each direction and connected Portland with Eugene, was introduced on a trial basis in August 1980 and discontinued at the end of 1981.

Government

Federal and state government 
In the United States House of Representatives, Milwaukie is in Oregon's 5th congressional district, which is represented by Republican Lori Chavez-DeRemer.

In the Oregon Legislative Assembly, Milwaukie is in the 21st Senate district, represented by Democrat Kathleen Taylor, and in the 41st House district, represented by Democrat Mark Gamba, a former mayor of the city.

City government 
The Mayor and City Council are elected at-large for four-year terms.

List of mayors 

Current mayor Lisa Batey took office on January 1st, 2023 after winning the November 2022 election against Kathy Hyzy.

Notable people

Bella Bixby, NWSL goalkeeper for Portland Thorns FC
Mike Bliss, NASCAR driver
Scott Brosius, Major League Baseball third baseman for Oakland Athletics and New York Yankees, 1998 World Series MVP
Cazzey Louis Cereghino, actor, singer, and writer
Peter Cookson, film, stage and television actor
Dave Husted, professional ten-pin bowler; three-time winner of PBA U.S. Open
Keynan Middleton, Major League pitcher for the Seattle Mariners
Karin Power, State Representative
Kenneth L. Reusser, Marine Corps aviator
Mike Richardson, publisher, Emmy Award-winning producer and founder of Dark Horse Comics
Chael Sonnen, MMA fighter
Dorothy Hester Stenzel, aviator and stunt pilot
Monroe Sweetland, politician
Jason Tanamor, author
Carolyn Tomei, former State Representative
William S. U'Ren, political activist

See also

References

External links

 City of Milwaukie (official website)

 
1847 establishments in Oregon Country
Cities in Clackamas County, Oregon
Cities in Multnomah County, Oregon
Cities in Oregon
Populated places established in 1847
Populated places on the Willamette River
Portland metropolitan area